The 2014–15 California Golden Bears men's basketball team represented the University of California, Berkeley in the 2014–15 NCAA Division I men's basketball season. This was Cuonzo Martin's first year as head coach at California. The Golden Bears played their home games at Haas Pavilion as members of the Pac-12 Conference. They finished the season 18–15, 7–11 in Pac-12 play to finish in a three-way tie for eighth place. They advanced to the quarterfinals of the Pac-12 tournament where they lost to Arizona.

Previous season 
The 2013–14 California Golden Bears finished the season with an overall record of 21–14, and 10–8 in Pac-12 play to finish in a five-way tie for third place. They lost in the quarterfinals of the Pac-12 tournament to Colorado. They received an at-large bid to the 2014 National Invitation Tournament where they defeated Utah Valley in the first round and Arkansas in the second round before losing in the quarterfinals to SMU.

On March 31, 2014, Head Coach Mike Montgomery announced his retirement from coaching.

Off Season

Departures

2014 recruiting class

Roster

Schedule

|-
!colspan=12 style="background:#010066; color:#FFCC33;"| Exhibition

|-
!colspan=12 style="background:#010066; color:#FFCC33;"| Non-conference regular season

|-
!colspan=12 style="background:#010066;"| Pac-12 regular season

|-
!colspan=12 style="background:#010066;"| Pac-12 tournament

Source

See also
2014–15 California Golden Bears women's basketball team

References

California
California Golden Bears men's basketball seasons
California Golden Bears men's basketball
California Golden